The second series of The Voice เสียงจริงตัวจริง ( also known as The Voice Thailand ) on 8 September 2013. The show was hosted by Kob Songsit and Joy Rinranee on Channel 3.

Teams
Colour key
  Winner
  Runners-up
  Third/Fourth place
  Eliminated in the Live shows
  Eliminated in the Knockouts
  Artist was stolen by another coach in the Battle rounds (Name is strike-throughed)
  Eliminated in the Battles

The Blind Auditions

 Key
  – Coach hit his/her "I WANT YOU" button
  – Artist eliminated with no coach pressing his or her "I WANT YOU" button
  – Artist defaulted to this coach's team
  – Artist elected to join this coach's team

Episode 1

Group performance: The Voice Thailand Coaches – "คิดถึงฉันไหมเวลาที่เธอ"

Episode 2

Episode 3

Episode 4

Episode 5

Episode 6

Battle Rounds
This year's battle rounds featured a new "steal" twist. After each battle round the losing artist then pitched to the other three coaches on why they should join their team. It was then up to the coaches (who have a limited amount of time) to press their red button to steal the artist. They could press their button as many times as they liked but were only allowed to steal two artists. If more than one coach wanted to steal the same artist then it was up to the artist to decide which team to join.

The battle round advisors were Kong working with Pu Aunchiree, 
Kim with Co Mr.Saxman, 
Joey boy with Ben Charatip 
and Stamp with Kai Suthee.

Episode 7-10: Battle Rounds
  – Coach hit his/her "I WANT YOU" button
  – Artist defaulted to this coaches team
  – Artist elected to join this coaches team
  – Battle winner
  – Battle loser
  - Battle loser but was saved by another coach

Despite having used his two steals already, Joey still pressed his button.

Knock outs
 – Knockout winner
 – Eliminated artist

Episode 11-12: Knockouts

Group performance: The Voice Thailand Coach - มันคงเป็นความรัก, ลึกสุดใจ, ร้ายก็รัก, สายลม

Live shows

Episode 13: Live Playoff, Week 1
Broadcast on 
  – Advanced artist 
  – Eliminated artist

Episode 14: Live Playoff, Week 2
Broadcast on 
  – Advanced artist
  – Eliminated artist

Episode 15: Final
Broadcast on 
  Winner
  Runner-up
  Third/fourth place

The Voice Thailand
2013 Thai television seasons